The 2023 Cleveland Guardians season will be the 123rd season for the franchise.

Offseason

Rule changes 
Pursuant to the CBA, new rule changes will be in place for the 2023 season:

 institution of a pitch clock between pitches;
 limits on pickoff attempts per plate appearance;
 limits on defensive shifts requiring two infielders to be on either side of second and be within the boundary of the infield; and
 larger bases (increased to 18-inch squares);

Regular season

Game Log

|- style="background: 
| 1 || March 30 || @ Mariners || – || || || — || || – ||
|- style="background: 
| 2 || March 31 || @ Mariners || – || || || — || || – ||
|- style="background: 
| 3 || April 1 || @ Mariners || – || || || — || || – ||
|- style="background: 
| 4 || April 2 || @ Mariners || – || || || — || || – ||
|- style="background: 
| 5 || April 3 || @ Athletics || – || || || — || || – ||
|- style="background: 
| 6 || April 4 || @ Athletics || – || || || — || || – ||
|- style="background: 
| 7 || April 5 || @ Athletics || – || || || — || || – ||
|- style="background: 
| 8 || April 7 || Mariners || – || || || — || || – ||
|- style="background: 
| 9 || April 8 || Mariners || – || || || — || || – ||
|- style="background: 
| 10 || April 9 || Mariners || – || || || — || || – ||
|- style="background: 
| 11 || April 10 || Yankees || – || || || — || || – ||
|- style="background: 
| 12 || April 11 || Yankees || – || || || — || || – ||
|- style="background: 
| 13 || April 12 || Yankees || – || || || — || || – ||
|- style="background: 
| 14 || April 14 || @ Nationals || – || || || — || || – ||
|- style="background: 
| 15 || April 15 || @ Nationals || – || || || — || || – ||
|- style="background: 
| 16 || April 16 || @ Nationals || – || || || — || || – ||
|- style="background: 
| 17 || April 17 || @ Tigers || – || || || — || || – ||
|- style="background: 
| 18 || April 18 || @ Tigers || – || || || — || || – ||
|- style="background: 
| 19 || April 19 || @ Tigers || – || || || — || || – ||
|- style="background: 
| 20 || April 21 || Marlins || – || || || — || || – ||
|- style="background: 
| 21 || April 22 || Marlins || – || || || — || || – ||
|- style="background: 
| 22 || April 23 || Marlins || – || || || — || || – ||
|- style="background: 
| 23 || April 24 || Rockies || – || || || — || || – ||
|- style="background: 
| 24 || April 25 || Rockies || – || || || — || || – ||
|- style="background: 
| 25 || April 26 || Rockies || – || || || — || || – ||
|- style="background: 
| 26 || April 28 || @ Red Sox || – || || || — || || – ||
|- style="background: 
| 27 || April 29 || @ Red Sox || – || || || — || || – ||
|- style="background: 
| 28 || April 30 || @ Red Sox || – || || || — || || – ||
|- 
 

|- style="background: 
| 29 || May 1 || @ Yankees || – || || || — || || – ||
|- style="background: 
| 30 || May 2 || @ Yankees || – || || || — || || – ||
|- style="background: 
| 31 || May 3 || @ Yankees || – || || || — || || – ||
|- style="background: 
| 32 || May 5 || Twins || – || || || — || || – ||
|- style="background: 
| 33 || May 6 || Twins || – || || || — || || – ||
|- style="background: 
| 34 || May 7 || Twins || – || || || — || || – ||
|- style="background: 
| 35 || May 8 || Tigers || – || || || — || || – ||
|- style="background: 
| 36 || May 9 || Tigers || – || || || — || || – ||
|- style="background: 
| 37 || May 10 || Tigers || – || || || — || || – ||
|- style="background: 
| 38 || May 12 || Angels || – || || || — || || – ||
|- style="background: 
| 39 || May 13 || Angels || – || || || — || || – ||
|- style="background: 
| 40 || May 14 || Angels || – || || || — || || – ||
|- style="background: 
| 41 || May 16 || @ White Sox || – || || || — || || – ||
|- style="background: 
| 42 || May 17 || @ White Sox || – || || || — || || – ||
|- style="background: 
| 43 || May 18 || @ White Sox || – || || || — || || – ||
|- style="background: 
| 44 || May 19 || @ Mets || – || || || — || || – ||
|- style="background: 
| 45 || May 20 || @ Mets || – || || || — || || – ||
|- style="background: 
| 46 || May 21 || @ Mets || – || || || — || || – ||
|- style="background: 
| 47 || May 22 || White Sox || – || || || — || || – ||
|- style="background: 
| 48 || May 23 || White Sox || – || || || — || || – ||
|- style="background: 
| 49 || May 24 || White Sox || – || || || — || || – ||
|- style="background: 
| 50 || May 26 || Cardinals || – || || || — || || – ||
|- style="background: 
| 51 || May 27 || Cardinals || – || || || — || || – ||
|- style="background: 
| 52 || May 28 || Cardinals || – || || || — || || – ||
|- style="background: 
| 53 || May 29 || @ Orioles || – || || || — || || – ||
|- style="background: 
| 54 || May 30 || @ Orioles || – || || || — || || – ||
|- style="background: 
| 55 || May 31 || @ Orioles || – || || || — || || – ||
|- 
 

|- style="background: 
| 56 || June 1 || @ Twins || – || || || — || || – ||
|- style="background: 
| 57 || June 2 || @ Twins || – || || || — || || – ||
|- style="background: 
| 58 || June 3 || @ Twins || – || || || — || || – ||
|- style="background: 
| 59 || June 4 || @ Twins || – || || || — || || – || 
|- style="background: 
| 60 || June 6 || Red Sox || – || || || — || || – ||
|- style="background: 
| 61 || June 7 || Red Sox || – || || || — || || – ||
|- style="background: 
| 62 || June 8 || Red Sox || – || || || — || || – ||
|- style="background: 
| 63 || June 9 || Astros || – || || || — || || – ||
|- style="background: 
| 64 || June 10 || Astros || – || || || — || || – ||
|- style="background: 
| 65 || June 11 || Astros || – || || || — || || – ||
|- style="background: 
| 66 || June 13 || @ Padres || – || || || — || || – ||
|- style="background: 
| 67 || June 14 || @ Padres || – || || || — || || – ||
|- style="background: 
| 68 || June 15 || @ Padres || – || || || — || || – ||
|- style="background: 
| 69 || June 16 || @ Diamondbacks || – || || || — || || – ||
|- style="background: 
| 70 || June 17 || @ Diamondbacks || – || || || — || || – ||
|- style="background: 
| 71 || June 18 || @ Diamondbacks || – || || || — || || – ||
|- style="background: 
| 72 || June 20 || Athletics || – || || || — || || – ||
|- style="background: 
| 73 || June 21 || Athletics || – || || || — || || – ||
|- style="background: 
| 74 || June 22 || Athletics || – || || || — || || – ||
|- style="background: 
| 75 || June 23 || Brewers || – || || || — || || – ||
|- style="background: 
| 76 || June 24 || Brewers || – || || || — || || – ||
|- style="background: 
| 77 || June 25 || Brewers || – || || || — || || – ||
|- style="background: 
| 78 || June 27 || @ Royals || – || || || — || || – ||
|- style="background: 
| 79 || June 28 || @ Royals || – || || || — || || – ||
|- style="background: 
| 80 || June 29 || @ Royals || – || || || — || || – ||
|- style="background: 
| 81 || June 30 || @ Cubs || – || || || — || || – ||
|- 
 

|- style="background: 
| 82 || July 1 || @ Cubs || – || || || — || || – ||
|- style="background: 
| 83 || July 2 || @ Cubs || – || || || — || || – ||
|- style="background: 
| 84 || July 3 || Braves || – || || || — || || – ||
|- style="background: 
| 85 || July 4 || Braves || – || || || — || || – ||
|- style="background: 
| 86 || July 5 || Braves || – || || || — || || – ||
|- style="background: 
| 87 || July 6 || Royals || – || || || — || || – ||
|- style="background: 
| 88 || July 7 || Royals || – || || || — || || – ||
|- style="background: 
| 89 || July 8 || Royals || – || || || — || || – ||
|- style="background: 
| 90 || July 9 || Royals || – || || || — || || – ||
|- style="text-align:center; background:#bbcaff;"
| colspan="12" | 93rd All-Star Game: Seattle, WA
|- style="background: 
| 91 || July 14 || @ Rangers || – || || || — || || – ||
|- style="background: 
| 92 || July 15 || @ Rangers || – || || || — || || – ||
|- style="background: 
| 93 || July 16 || @ Rangers || – || || || — || || – ||
|- style="background: 
| 94 || July 17 || @ Pirates || – || || || — || || – ||
|- style="background: 
| 95 || July 18 || @ Pirates || – || || || — || || – ||
|- style="background: 
| 96 || July 19 || @ Pirates || – || || || — || || – ||
|- style="background: 
| 97 || July 21 || Phillies || – || || || — || || – ||
|- style="background: 
| 98 || July 22 || Phillies || – || || || — || || – ||
|- style="background: 
| 99 || July 23 || Phillies || – || || || — || || – ||
|- style="background: 
| 100 || July 24 || Royals || – || || || — || || – ||
|- style="background: 
| 101 || July 25 || Royals || – || || || — || || – ||
|- style="background: 
| 102 || July 26 || Royals || – || || || — || || – ||
|- style="background: 
| 103 || July 27 || @ White Sox || – || || || — || || – ||
|- style="background: 
| 104 || July 28 || @ White Sox || – || || || — || || – ||
|- style="background: 
| 105 || July 29 || @ White Sox || – || || || — || || – ||
|- style="background: 
| 106 || July 30 || @ White Sox || – || || || — || || – ||
|- style="background: 
| 107 || July 31 || @ Astros || – || || || — || || – ||
|- 
 

|- style="background: 
| 108 || August 1 || @ Astros || – || || || — || || – ||
|- style="background: 
| 109 || August 2 || @ Astros || – || || || — || || – ||
|- style="background: 
| 110 || August 4 || White Sox || – || || || — || || – ||
|- style="background: 
| 111 || August 5 || White Sox || – || || || — || || – ||
|- style="background: 
| 112 || August 6 || White Sox || – || || || — || || – ||
|- style="background: 
| 113 || August 7 || Blue Jays || – || || || — || || – ||
|- style="background: 
| 114 || August 8 || Blue Jays || – || || || — || || – ||
|- style="background: 
| 115 || August 9 || Blue Jays || – || || || — || || – ||
|- style="background: 
| 116 || August 10 || Blue Jays || – || || || — || || – ||
|- style="background: 
| 117 || August 11 || @ Rays || – || || || — || || – ||
|- style="background: 
| 118 || August 12 || @ Rays || – || || || — || || – ||
|- style="background: 
| 119 || August 13 || @ Rays || – || || || — || || – ||
|- style="background: 
| 120 || August 15 || @ Reds || – || || || — || || – ||
|- style="background: 
| 121 || August 16 || @ Reds || – || || || — || || – ||
|- style="background: 
| 122 || August 17 || Tigers || – || || || — || || – ||
|- style="background: 
| 123 || August 18 || Tigers || – || || || — || || – ||
|- style="background: 
| 124 || August 19 || Tigers || – || || || — || || – ||
|- style="background: 
| 125 || August 20 || Tigers || – || || || — || || – ||
|- style="background: 
| 126 || August 22 || Dodgers || – || || || — || || – ||
|- style="background: 
| 127 || August 23 || Dodgers || – || || || — || || – ||
|- style="background: 
| 128 || August 24 || Dodgers || – || || || — || || – ||
|- style="background: 
| 129 || August 25 || @ Blue Jays || – || || || — || || – ||
|- style="background: 
| 130 || August 26 || @ Blue Jays || – || || || — || || – ||
|- style="background: 
| 131 || August 27 || @ Blue Jays || – || || || — || || – ||
|- style="background:
| 132 || August 28 || @ Twins || – || || || — || || – ||
|- style="background:
| 133 || August 29 || @ Twins || – || || || — || || – ||
|- style="background:
| 134 || August 30 || @ Twins || – || || || — || || – ||
|- 
 

|- style="background: 
| 135 || September 1 || Rays || – || || || — || || – ||
|- style="background: 
| 136 || September 2 || Rays || – || || || — || || – ||
|- style="background: 
| 137 || September 3 || Rays || – || || || — || || – ||
|- style="background: 
| 138 || September 4 || Twins || – || || || — || || – ||
|- style="background: 
| 139 || September 5 || Twins || – || || || — || || – ||
|- style="background: 
| 140 || September 6 || Twins || – || || || — || || – ||
|- style="background: 
| 141 || September 7 || @ Angels || – || || || — || || – ||
|- style="background: 
| 142 || September 8 || @ Angels || – || || || — || || – ||
|- style="background: 
| 143 || September 9 || @ Angels || – || || || — || || – ||
|- style="background: 
| 144 || September 10 || @ Angels || – || || || — || || – ||
|- style="background: 
| 145 || September 11 || @ Giants || – || || || — || || – ||
|- style="background: 
| 146 || September 12 || @ Giants || – || || || — || || – ||
|- style="background: 
| 147 || September 13 || @ Giants || – || || || — || || – ||
|- style="background: 
| 148 || September 15 || Rangers || – || || || — || || – ||
|- style="background: 
| 149 || September 16 || Rangers || – || || || — || || – ||
|- style="background: 
| 150 || September 17 || Rangers || – || || || — || || – ||
|- style="background: 
| 151 || September 18 || @ Royals || – || || || — || || – ||
|- style="background: 
| 152 || September 19 || @ Royals || – || || || — || || – ||
|- style="background: 
| 153 || September 20 || @ Royals || – || || || — || || – ||
|- style="background: 
| 154 || September 21 || Orioles || – || || || — || || – ||
|- style="background: 
| 155 || September 22 || Orioles || – || || || — || || – ||
|- style="background: 
| 156 || September 23 || Orioles || – || || || — || || – ||
|- style="background: 
| 157 || September 24 || Orioles || – || || || — || || – ||
|- style="background: 
| 158 || September 26 || Reds || – || || || — || || – ||
|- style="background: 
| 159 || September 27 || Reds || – || || || — || || – ||
|- style="background: 
| 160 || September 29 || @ Tigers || – || || || — || || – ||
|- style="background: 
| 161 || September 30 || @ Tigers || – || || || — || || – ||
|- style="background: 
| 162 || October 1 || @ Tigers || – || || || — || || – ||
|-

|- style="text-align:center;"
| Legend:       = Win       = Loss       = PostponementBold = Guardians team member

Season standings

American League Central

American League Wild Card

Player stats

Batting
Note: G = Games played; AB = At bats; R = Runs scored; H = Hits; 2B = Doubles; 3B = Triples; HR = Home runs; RBI = Runs batted in; AVG = Batting average; SB = Stolen bases

Pitching
Note: W = Wins; L = Losses; ERA = Earned run average; G = Games pitched; GS = Games started; SV = Saves; IP = Innings pitched; H = Hits allowed; R = Runs allowed; ER = Earned runs allowed; BB = Walks allowed; K = Strikeouts

Current roster

Farm system

References

External links
 Cleveland Guardians 2023 Schedule at MLB.com
 2023 Cleveland Guardians at Baseball Reference

Cleveland Guardians
Cleveland Guardians
Cleveland Guardians seasons